Kani Pankeh Qajer (also Romanized as Kānī Pānkeh Qājer; also known as Kāni Panka, Kānī Pānkeh, Kānī Pankeh-ye Tājer, and Kānī Ponkeh Tājer) is a village in Il Teymur Rural District, in the Central District of Bukan County, West Azerbaijan Province, Iran. At the 2006 census, its population was 66, in 12 families.

References 

Populated places in Bukan County